Janq'u Laqaya (Aymara janq'u white, laqaya ruins of a building, "white ruin", also spelled Jankho Lacaya) is a mountain in the Andes of Bolivia which reaches a height of approximately . It is located in the Oruro Department, Sajama Province, Curahuara de Carangas Municipality, south of Ch'apiri.

References 

Mountains of Oruro Department